Perlo  may refer to:

Places
Perlo, Piedmont, a comune in the Province of Cuneo, Italy
 Perlő, the Hungarian name for Brebu Commune, Caraş-Severin County, Romania

People
Phil Perlo, American football player
Victor Perlo, an American  economist

Other uses
Perlo group, an American network of Soviet espionage agents